Edi Mall (March 16, 1924 – September 4, 2014) was an Austrian alpine skier who competed in the 1948 Winter Olympics.

References

1924 births
2014 deaths
Austrian male alpine skiers
Olympic alpine skiers of Austria
Alpine skiers at the 1948 Winter Olympics